Stropharia coronilla, commonly known as the garland roundhead or garland stropharia, is a species of mushroom native to Europe and North America. It is considered poisonous.

References

Fungi described in 1791
Fungi of North America
Fungi of Europe
Poisonous fungi
Strophariaceae